Matthijs Büchli (born 13 December 1992) is a Dutch road and track cyclist, who currently rides for UCI Track Team .

He became world champion in the keirin at the 2018 UCI Track Cycling World Championships. In 2016, Büchli won the silver medal in the men's keirin at the Olympic Games in Rio de Janeiro, despite experiencing a severe knee injury only five months before the Olympic Games. Büchli was also a part of the team that won the gold medal at the 2020 Summer Olympics in the team sprint event.

Büchli has been a member of the commercial team of  together with Theo Bos since 2017.

Major results
Source:

2011
 National Championships
2nd Kilo
2nd Omnium
3rd Keirin
2012
 National Championships
1st  Sprint
3rd Keirin
2013
 1st Keirin, 2012–13 UCI Track Cycling World Cup, Aguascalientes
 3rd Keirin, UCI World Championships
2014
 3rd Keirin, UCI World Championships
2016
 2nd Keirin, Summer Olympics
 2nd Team sprint, UCI World Championships
2017
 2nd Team sprint, UCI World Championships
 3rd Team sprint, UEC European Championships
2018
 1st  Team sprint, UCI World Championships
 National Championships
1st  Sprint
3rd Team sprint
2019
 UCI Track Cycling World Championships
1st  Team sprint
1st  Keirin
2021
 1st  Team sprint, Olympic Games

Further information
 "Double delight for GB cyclists.(Sport)." Birmingham Mail (England). MGN Ltd. 2013. HighBeam Research. 30 April 2013
 "Kenny grabs keirin crown; UPDATE.(Sport)." Daily Record (Glasgow, Scotland). MGN Ltd. 2013. 30 April 2013
 "Yates wins points race at track cycling worlds." Yakima Herald-Republic. Yakima Herald-Republic. 2013. 30 April 2013

References

External links
 

1992 births
Living people
Dutch male cyclists
Dutch track cyclists
Cyclists at the 2016 Summer Olympics
Cyclists at the 2020 Summer Olympics
Olympic cyclists of the Netherlands
Dutch cyclists at the UCI Track Cycling World Championships
Olympic silver medalists for the Netherlands
Medalists at the 2016 Summer Olympics
Olympic medalists in cycling
Sportspeople from Haarlem
UCI Track Cycling World Champions (men)
European Championships (multi-sport event) gold medalists
Olympic gold medalists for the Netherlands
Medalists at the 2020 Summer Olympics
Cyclists from North Holland
21st-century Dutch people